Wood Farm may be:

 Wood Farm, a cottage on the Sandringham Estate in Norfolk, England
 Wood Farm, Oxfordshire, a district of Oxford, England

See also 
 Woods Mill Farm, Maryland, USA